The Impulse Fire Extinguishing System (abbreviated IFEX) is a series of firefighting equipment that uses small amounts of water fired in high-velocity bursts to put out fires. Engineer Frans Steur began IFEX GmbH in 1994.   Water droplets are shot in vaporous bursts that can travel up to 120 metres per second,   causing a strong cooling effect that is responsible for much of this system's success.  Handheld, backpack, motorcycle, ATV,  tractor, helicopter, and other applications are available.

See also
Fog nozzle

References

External links

IFEX Technologies website

Firefighting equipment